Scobey soil is the state soil of Montana. It is named for the town of Scobey, and although Scobey is in far northeast Montana, the soil type is found in the "Golden Triangle" area of North-Central Montana, bounded by Great Falls, Havre, and Conrad.

Scobey soil consists of very deep, well drained soils on till plains, hills, and moraines. It is known for its productivity for farming wheat.

See also
Pedology (soil study)
List of U.S. state soils
Graffiti

References

External links
http://ortho.ftw.nrcs.usda.gov/osd/dat/S/SCOBEY.html
https://web.archive.org/web/20070527180603/http://www.mt.nrcs.usda.gov/soils/mtsoils/

Pedology
Soil in the United States
Geology of Montana
Agriculture in Montana
Types of soil
Symbols of Montana